Boechera fecunda (syn. Arabis fecunda) is a species of flowering plant in the mustard family known by the common names Mt. Sapphire rockcress and bitterroot rockcress. It is endemic to Montana in the United States, where there are twenty known occurrences in three counties.

Description
This perennial herb produces a basal rosette of leaves. The basal leaves are spoon-shaped or lance-shaped and measure 1 to 3 centimeters in length. Leaves higher on the stem are smaller and clasp the stalk. The plant is coated in grayish hairs. The flowering stalk is up to 30 centimeters tall and has white or blue-tinged flowers. The fruit is a hairy grayish silique up to 5 centimeters long. The plant has two reproductive modes. Some plants produce axillary flowers and some produce terminal flowers at the top of the stem. Some produce both. Plants with terminal inflorescences are often semelparous, blooming once and then dying. Axillary-flowering plants may be iteroparous, flowering several seasons.

Distribution and habitat
This plant grows in Ravalli, Beaverhead, and Silver Bow Counties in Montana. It grows in the ecotone between the lower tree line and the shrub- and grasslands. It grows on steep, eroding cliffs that are sparsely vegetated. The soils are calcareous, made up of a calcium silicate parent rock. The plant is associated with Pseudotsuga menziesii and Pinus ponderosa. The plant commonly grows in areas covered in a cryptogamic soil crust, which appears to have a beneficial effect on the plants.

Conservation
Threats to the species include the noxious weed Centaurea maculosa, spotted knapweed. The weed has a negative effect on rockcress populations, reducing seedling establishment. Livestock are another threat, trampling the land and facilitating the introduction of weeds. Mining activity is another threat.

References

External links
USDA Plants Profile

Further reading
Hamilton, M. B. and T. Mitchell-Olds. (1994). The mating system and relative performance of selfed and outcrossed progeny in Arabis fecunda (Brassicaceae). Am J Bot 81(10) 1252-56.
McKay, J. K., et al. (2001). Local adaptation across a climatic gradient despite small effective population size in the rare sapphire rockcress. Proc R Soc Lond B 268 1715-21.
Song, B. and T. Mitchell-Olds. (2007). High genetic diversity and population differentiation in Boechera fecunda, a rare relative of Arabidopsis. Molecular Ecology 16(19) 4079-88.

fecunda
Flora of Montana
Plants described in 1984
Flora of North America